Predrag Stilinović is a Croatian football manager.

In June 2003 he replaced Davor Mladina as NK Marsonia manager. After only seven points in six matches, Mladina replaced Stilinović, only to be sacked in November.

He was later an academy coach at HNK Rijeka before working at Gabriele Volpi's academy in Abuja. From 2018 to 2020 he managed UAE club Al-Arabi.

References

Year of birth missing (living people)
Living people
Croatian football managers
Croatian Football League managers
HNK Orijent managers
NK Varaždin managers
HNK Rijeka managers
NK Marsonia managers
NK Croatia Sesvete managers
Croatian expatriate football managers
Expatriate football managers in the United Arab Emirates
Croatian expatriate sportspeople in the United Arab Emirates